This list includes all coastal and inland islands, cays, isles and islets. It also includes named island groups, archipelagos and island clumps.

This list is complete with respect to the 1996 Gazetteer of Australia. Dubious names have been checked against the online 2004 data, and in all cases confirmed correct. However, if any islands have been gazetted or deleted since 1996, this list does not reflect these changes. Strictly speaking, Australian place names are gazetted in capital letters only; the names in this list have been converted to mixed case in accordance with normal capitalisation conventions. Locations are as gazetted; some islands may extend over large areas.


R

S

T

See also
Coastal regions of Western Australia
List of islands of Western Australia
List of islands of Western Australia, 0–9, A–C
List of islands of Western Australia, D–G
List of islands of Western Australia, H–L
List of islands of Western Australia, M–Q
List of islands of Western Australia, U–Z
Sortable list of islands of Western Australia

References

 R-T
Lists of coordinates